Thomas Arthur Hilditch (10 January 1885 – 7 August 1957) was an English cricketer.  Hilditch was a right-handed batsman who bowled right-arm fast-medium.  He was born at Sandbach, Cheshire.

Hilditch made his first-class debut for Warwickshire against Northamptonshire in the 1907 County Championship.  In that season and the one which followed, Hilditch made six first-class appearances for the county.  In 1910, he appeared three times for his native Cheshire in the Minor Counties Championship, playing against the Nottinghamshire Second XI, the Yorkshire Second XI and Staffordshire.  He next appeared in first-class cricket for Warwickshire in the 1912 County Championship against Leicestershire.  He made a further first-class appearance in the 1913 County Championship against Gloucestershire.  In his total of eight first-class appearances for the county, he took 9 wickets at an average of 35.44, with best figures of 3/41.  With the bat, he scored 42 runs at a batting average of 4.20, with a high score of 17.

He died at Bermuda, Warwickshire, on 7 August 1957.

References

External links
Thomas Hilditch at ESPNcricinfo
Thomas Hilditch at CricketArchive

1885 births
1957 deaths
People from Sandbach
English cricketers
Warwickshire cricketers
Cheshire cricketers
Cricketers from Cheshire